This page summarizes 2019 in Estonian football.

National team

Men's

Senior

Under-23

Under-21

Under-19

Under-18

Under-17

Under-16

Women's

Senior

U19

Futsal

League system

Men

Meistriliiga

Ten teams will compete in the league, nine sides from the 2018 season and 2018 Esiliiga champions Maardu Linnameeskond. Vaprus were relegated at the end of the 2018 season after finishing in the bottom of the table. Maardu Linnameeskond will be making their Meistriliiga debut having previously declined promotion after winning the 2017 Esiliiga. Kuressaare retained their Meistriliiga spot after winning a relegation playoff against Esiliiga runners-up Elva.

On the 27th of October it was mathematically confirmed that FC Flora regained the title after one season. In the second to last round it was confirmed that newcomer Maardu Linnameeskond will be relegated after its debut season and that Paide Linnameeskond, who spent most of the season in the top three, will finish fourth. During the final round, JK Tallinna Kalev managed to escape the relegation play-offs spot and therefore FC Kuressaare had to take that place. They competed against Esiliiga's second independent team Pärnu JK Vaprus and defeated them in a home-and-away play-off. The season's top goalscorer was Erik Sorga, while the best player and assister was Konstantin Vassiljev. Flora's manager Jürgen Henn was awarded the Albert Vollrat's trophy (best manager of the year).

Esiliiga

A total of 10 teams were contesting the league, including 6 sides from the 2018 season, one relegated from 2018 Meistriliiga and three promoted from the 2018 Esiliiga B. The 2017 Esiliiga and 2018 Esiliiga champions Maardu Linnameeskond got promoted to the highest tier for the first time. Nõmme Kalju FC U21 was the first team to suffer relegation after just returning to Esiliiga. Keila JK also immediately returned to Esiliiga B after losing the relegation play-offs to Kohtla-Järve JK Järve. JK Tallinna Kalev U21 narrowly avoided getting relegated in their debut season thanks to Tartu FC Santos' decision to start the new season in the fourth tier. The other two teams getting promoted were Tallinna JK Legion, who went almost unbeaten in their previous season, and Tartu JK Tammeka U21, who will be making their debut in Esiliiga.

Esiliiga B

Of the 10 participating teams 5 remained following the 2018 Esiliiga B. The 2018 champions Legion, runners-up Tammeka U21 and 3rd placed Järve were promoted to Esiliiga, while 9th and 10th placed Ajax and Flora U19 were relegated to II liiga. They are replaced by Viimsi JK, who returned after a year in the lower leagues, Põhja-Tallinna JK Volta and Tabasalu JK, who are making their debut in the top leagues. Volta and Viimsi both finished the last season on top of their leagues and Tabasalu defeated Ajax in the play-offs. The teams which were relegated from higher tiers were Nõmme Kalju FC U21  and Keila JK, who both got to play a season in Esiliiga. Keila lost in the play-offs against Järve.

II liiga

III liiga

IV liiga

Post-season games

League winners 

II liiga

Home teams listed on top of bracket. (AET): At Extra Time

III liiga

Home teams listed on top of bracket. (AET): At Extra Time

IV liiga

In 2019 the competition did not have a "final match" between the divisions best clubs, because of the format change which put the tier's top six teams in the same group. This meant that the teams had the chance to play with all of their rival clubs and a separate final was not needed. The league was won by Nõmme Kalju III.

Promotion & Relegation play-offs 

To Meistriliiga

|}
To Esiliiga

|}
To Esiliiga B

|}
 The play-off between Esiliiga B's 8th team (Paide Linnameeskond U21) and first round winner (Sillamäe Kalev) was not held, because FCI Tallinn and JK Tallinna Kalev III (teams, who were supposed to be promoted) both turned down the possibility and so Esiliiga B's 8th and 9th (Võru Helios) were saved from relegation.

To II liiga

|-

|}

|-

|}

To III liiga

|}

Women

1. Club did not want to compete in Esiliiga and decided to join II liiga.
2. Club did not enter the Championship.
3. Club got the chance to play in II liiga, because some other teams from the higher division or on higher positions last season chose not to.
4. Club is making its debut

Naiste Meistriliiga

Naiste Esiliiga

Naiste Teine liiga

Post-season games
To Naiste Esiliiga

|}

Youth

 The brackets in the league category show how many teams and games were there in the league
 The brackets in the medalists category show how many points the respective team earned during the season.

Cup competitions

Estonian Cup

Home teams listed on top of bracket. (AET): At Extra Time

Small Cup

Home teams listed on top of bracket. (AET): At Extra Time

Super Cup

Estonian Women's Cup

Home teams listed on top of bracket. (AET): At Extra Time

Women's Super Cup

European competitions
Nõmme Kalju FC

FC Flora

FCI Levadia

JK Narva Trans

Indoor football

League season

Play-offs
League winner
Play-offs are played to two wins.

|}

|}
Final is played to three wins.

|}

Promotion to Betsafe Saaliliiga
Play-offs are played to two wins.

|}
Promotion to Saali Esiliiga
Play-offs contain two games.

|}

Cup

Home teams listed on top of bracket. (AET): At Extra Time

Super Cup

Beach football

Rannajalgpalli Meistriliiga

Rannajalgpalli Esiliiga

Winter tournaments

Year-ending tournament

County Competition

2019 Fixtures

References

Eesti alustab uut aastat mängudega kahe põhjamaa koondise vastu - Soccernet

Jalgpalliliidu juhatus kinnitas tippliigade koosseisud - Estonian FA

 
Seasons in Estonian football